Brzydula (stylized as BrzydUla; in Polish brzydula means ugly woman while Ula is a common diminutive of the name Urszula) was a Polish telenovela that premiered on 6 October 2008, on TVN in Poland. The series was an adaptation of the Colombian telenovela Yo soy Betty, la fea. The Polish version told the story of an ugly but smart girl who started to work at the Febo & Dobrzański fashion house, and she fell in love with her boss, Marek Dobrzański. Ula had a sick father, Józef, a teenage brother, Jasiek, and a much younger sister, Beatka. The telenovela also told the stories of Ula's friends' and coworkers' lives.
The series was first broadcast from Monday to Friday at 5:55pm, replaying the next day at 8:00am and Saturday at 4:40pm (when episodes were emitted from the whole week). The series was carried out in HD. HD version of the show was available on the TVN channel. HD broadcast takes place in parallel with the issue on the TVN channel.

The opening song was "Tyle słońca w całym mieście" by Anna Jantar, sung by Julia Kamińska.

In June 2020, it was announced that BrzydUla was returning to TVN. 180 new episodes will appear at TVN 7 at 5 October 2020.

Story 
Show tells the story of Ula Cieplak, a not very pretty, but very talented and smart girl. Ula manages to get a job in a very prestigious fashion house Febo & Dobrzański, and falls in love with her boss, Marek Dobrzański, although he has a fiancée, a co-owner of the company, Paulina Febo. Ula, as a very naive person, does not realize that Marek goes out with her only to save financial interest of the company. Because of her appearance, Ula is often an object of gossips and jokes. However, soon everyone realizes that she is an excellent employee and gradually built sympathy of her boss. As the time passes by, Marek falls in love with Ula and his relationship with Paulina ends. Meanwhile, Aleks plots against Marek, in order to gain full control over the company. As Ula changes her appearance, she gains recognition of Pshemko and the entire company, especially Adam, as well as gaining a lot of self-confidence.

Nothing is not certain until the last episode, but in the end everything ends happily for Ula. Marek rejected the proposal of Paulina, and left-out Paulina departures to Milan. During the fashion show, organized by Ula, Marek confesses his love. In the end, Ala and Józef, Anna and Maciek, Sebastian and Violetta and Ula and Marek end up together, and Kinga and Jasiek also reconcile.

Characters 
Urszula Dobrzańska (Cieplak) (Julia Kamińska) – a young, well-educated woman who comes from a village near Warsaw, who works at Febo & Dobrzański as an assistant to the CEO. Being a good economist, she becomes the company's financial director, but she soon resigns. Over time, she falls in love with the company's CEO, Marek Dobrzański. Shy and insecure, she does not try to win anything from him but his respect and friendship. At first, Ula is not received too warmly by her co-workers. People laugh at her and call her "ugly", mostly because of her poor sense of style: she wears large, grotesque glasses and colourful, mismatched clothes. With time, however, she proves to be a knowledgeable, valuable employee, and gains respect from her colleagues. She turns out to be a strong woman, able to save the company when it faces problems.

Marek Dobrzański (Filip Bobek) – a young CEO of Febo & Dobrzański, who recently took over the job after his father, Krzysztof. He is intelligent and widely respected. However, he has many weaknesses and tends to cheat on his fiancée, Paulina, mainly with models associated with the company. As the CEO, he can be too ambitious, which often gets him in states of collapse, during which others complain that he does not function well as a boss, and that he fails to trust his father, who is the highest authority. Marek, a sensitive man, quickly befriends Ula, and he eventually develops feelings for the assistant. With time, however, the situation changes. Marek turns into a negative figure, and the instigation of Sebastian decides to turn Ula's head, but only to save himself from further financial troubles by having her falsify a report as CFO. He was previously engaged to Paulina, but later fell for Ula.

Paulina Febo (Maja Hirsch) – Marek's fiancée. She is half-Italian, and her parents died in a car accident. Along with her only family – her brother Aleks, she is a permanent resident in Poland and works at Febo & Dobrzański. Paulina is a cool and dignified woman with high self-confidence. She often looks down at others within the company. On the other hand, she worries about her brother and wants to finally be happy. Paulina sincerely loves Marek, but she feels him to be increasingly cold and indifferent. Suspecting him to be having an affair, she instructs Violetta to find out who her competition is.

Violetta Kubasińska-Hu (Małgorzata Socha) – the secretary of Marek Dobrzański, initially works with Ula. She was employed not because of any particular qualifications, but through friendship with the president's girlfriend, Paulina, and thanks to her charm. At the same time, when she needs help, takes the pose of a false kindness to exploit the generosity of colleagues. At the end of the first and the beginning of the second series of Viola slowly begins to understand Ula, and even tries to help her a little bit (when Adam says that "it was fun with the boss"). She has an on and off relationship with Sebastian Olszański.

Maciej Szymczyk (Krzysztof Czeczot) – Ula's best friend even from childhood, who also lives nearby. Despite his education, he  had serious difficulties in finding a good job. For some time he worked as a washer in a pub, but left after a conflict with the boss. When Ula starts a separate company 'Proes', Maciej works with her. When Marek finally breaks her heart and tries to fix it, Maciek advises Ula and supports her. He is a sincere and straightforward man with a passion for old cars. After some misunderstandings, he begins to meet with Ania, the former receptionist and later an assistant-boss at the firm.

Józef Cieplak (Marek Włodarczyk) – Ula's father and a widower. After the death of his wife Magda, he worked hard to support her family, but later had to retire due to health problems with his heart. However, he tried to downplay the disease. He is a warm and caring father, trying to instill good principles in his three children. He falls in love with Ula's friend, Alicja, called Ala. Their neighbour Dąbrowska tried to interfere.

Jan Cieplak (Wacław Warchoł) – Ula's brother and son of Józef. He is a high school student, who is preparing for his final exams. At this time, he experiences period of rebellion, and moves out for two weeks prior to the exams, which worries his father. Ula recently arranged for his brother to work in a company model which brought him close to Magda. Eventually they separated and he became interested with Kinga, a fellow student, however, at that time she was already involved with Robson.

Beata Cieplak (Kalina Janusiak/Nel Kaczmarek) the youngest daughter of Józef, sister of Jasiek and Ula. She is clever and direct, yet very emotional and tied to the family, especially her father.

Aleksander Febo (Mariusz Zaniewski) – Paulina's brother, also half Italian. He typically plays a negative figure, from the beginning, being cocky and cynical. He is impolite, even to his former girlfriend, Julia Sławińska, the woman he loves. He disapproves of his sister's connection with Marek Dobrzański, whom he particularly hates, both because Aleks desires the Presidential position and, as it later turns out, because Julia once betrayed him with Marek.  After some time, Alex loses his position as Chief Financial Officer as a result of a scandal which erupted after Violetta recorded a conversation in which he proposed financial benefits in return for providing the materials compromising Marek. However, he made further attempts to deprive Marek of the presidency, with the help of Adam Turek.

Sebastian Olszański (Łukasz Garlicki) – Marek Dobrzański's best friend from his student days. He is in love with Viola, who likes rich men. Despite this, he is a womanizer interested more in short-lived dalliances than any long-term relationship.

Adam Turek (Łukasz Simlat) – chief accountant in Febo & Dobrzański, directly subordinate to Alex. Cheerful man, but quite straightforward and not too savvy. Adam has for Aleks great admiration and sincere friendship, despite the fact that very often he is insulted and reprimanded. To please Aleks, he helped him in all kinds of fraudulent activities, designed to discredit Marek, though he felt uneasy with this type of activity, but felt that the material advantages were worth it.

Alicja Cieplak-Milewska (Dorota Pomykała) – a woman in her fifties, one of the workers with the longest seniority in the company. She is a good and generous woman, very quickly becomes best friends with Ula. Her fiancé Wojtek died a month before the wedding, eventually grows close to Ula's father Józef.

Izabela Gajda (Dominika Kluźniak) – seamstress, chief assistant of Pshemko. At work, she had to learn to deal with the moods and whims of the designer, being fired many times but ultimately considered indispensable. She became friends with Ula early on in the latter's employment.

Ela (Katarzyna Zielinska) – she works at the cafe at Febo & Dobrzański, another friend of Ula. Young single mother. She is firm and strong woman mentally capable to make sacrifices for the good of her friends. She has feelings for one of the bodyguards.

Anna Szymczyk (Monika Fronczek) – receptionist, in the earlier episodes Sebastian's object of affection. She ended up studying English philology but also knows some Spanish. She dislikes Aleks and Violetta, who caused her problems with Paulina after she pretended that Ania and Marek were having an affair. In later episodes she dated Maciek, and ends the series as Ula's assistant.

Nadia Ulecka (Magdalena Koleśnik – Marek's assistant

Krzysztof Dobrzański (Krzysztof Jasinski) – Marek's father, former president and one of the founders of Febo & Dobrzański. He is  experienced and widely respected. He appears episodically in the series, aiming to reconcile Marek and Aleks, whose parents were his friends.

Helena Dobrzańska (Grażyna Strachota) – wife of Krzysztof, mother of Marek. She appears rarely, but was very pleased with the engagement of Marek to Paulina and tried to persuade him that his attachment to Ula was only temporary and that he and Paula should reconcile.

Anna and Francesco Febo – the parents of Paulina and Aleks. The Italian designer Francesco came to Poland to bring cheap leather jackets for the new collection, where he met Anna, a student of Italian. She introduced him to Helena, and then to Krzysztof. They later decided to start a clothing company in Poland. Although the beginnings were difficult, the company evolved and over time became one of the most exclusive fashion brands in the country. As they both died in a car accident, the story has never been shown on the show, but Ala explained the situation to Ula.

Julia Sławińska (Magdalena Mielcarz) – Aleks' old girlfriend, who betrayed him with Marek. The events of that period are not presented in the show, and Julia appears after some time, when after a longer stay in London and is employed at Febo & Dobrzański as a valued expert in Public Relations. Her re-encounter with Aleks and his conduct brings her pain. At the same time Marek tries at all costs to hide his past fleeting romance, and his betrayal of Paulina. Julia is even more embarrassed at the joy that Paulina expresses at her arrival and her treatment of her as an old friend.

Władysław (Michał Gadomski) – a security guard at the headquarters of Febo & Dobrzanski. Ela is romantically interested in him, and he takes over her job for the day when her son is ill.

Dorota (Paulina Klimaszewska) – the secretary of Aleks Febo.

Wojtek  (Maciej Radel) – son and assistant of Pshemko. He is friends with Jaciek, and after a while, falls in love with Violetta, sending her presents, of course, without reciprocity. He was accused of plagiarism.

Bartek Dąbrowski (Szymon Sędrowski) – Ula's ex-boyfriend; they broke up, because he cheated. He went to Germany, returning after a few years to attempt to regain Ula's faith for financial reasons.

Kinga Matysiak (Weronika Asińska) – Jasiek's love interest. At the beginning they had serious difficulties in meeting because of her overinvolved father, who eventually realises that he has been trying to essentially imprison her at home. When Jasiek falls for Magda, they separate, and she becomes involved with Robson.

Mr. Matysiak (Wojciech Asiński) – Kinga's tyrannical father, wanting to cut her daughter from any contact with their peers, especially Jaciek Cieplak and his family. His behavior makes his daughter run away from home and move in with Jasiek. Matysiak's attempts to force her to return do not work as the police inform him that as his daughter is of age, he has no such legal right. Eventually, his wife forces him to change his attitude to his daughter.

Ms. Matysiak (Anita Poddębniak) – Kinga's mother.

Robert called Robson (Aleks Sosiński) – Jasiek's best friend and a happy, carefree teenager. He is interested in computers and games, and later Magda, a model. Later he becomes Kinga's boyfriend.

Magda (Marta Dobecka) – Jasiek's colleague, a young model. They have a session together in South Africa.

Maria Szymczyk (Maria Maj) – Maciek's mother, a neighbor of the Cieplak family. A nice person.

Janina Dąbrowska (Elżbieta Jodłowska) – a neighbour of the Cieplak family. Interested in Józef.

Rysiek (Robert Wabich) – the owner of the pub, where Maciek worked for some time. Demanding and nervous.

Małgorzata Poznachowska (Aleksandra Kisio) – best friend of Viola Kubasińska.

Courier (Marek Jasek) – courier of the Polish Post. His name is Marcin and he appears in comic situations.

Klaudia Nowicka (Weronika Książkiewicz) – model, the main face of the company Febo & Dobrzański. Her photos decorate the cover of catalogs. She is still in love with Marek, her former lover.

Dominika "Domi" (Maria Góralczyk) – the main rival of Klaudia, both in the fashion world, as well as in applying for the feelings of Marek. She is the face of the brand Febo & Dobrzański Sportivo.

Mirabella (Katarzyna Sowińska) – another model and fleeting lover of Mark. In addition to her modeling career, she also began work as a singer.

Lew Korzyński (Lev Murzenko) – a Russian who liked Paulina Febo.

Dariusz Terlecki (Krzysztof Janczar) – demanding businessman, teamed up with the company Febo & Dobrzański.

Bogdan Zarzycki (Dariusz Jakubowski) – sport activist, trying at all costs to settle the contract signing Febo & Dobrzański with the representation of football.

Piotr Sosnowski (Maciej Brzoska) – cardiologist doctor, working as a receptionist where he met Ula. He is divorced and fell for Ula. Piotr suggested a trip to the USA. Ula broke up with him.

Daniel Raczyński (Daniel Kasprowicz) – the new receptionist at Febo & Dobrzański.

Alda Turek (Elżbieta Romanowska) – sister of Adam Turek.

Maja Olkowicz (Joanna Osyda) – friend of Ula, who appears in the final episode.

Artur Kaczmarek (Jacek Kopczyński) – the photographer at Febo & Dobrzański. He fell for  Violetta, who agreed to meet him, though their relationship did not last.

Pshemko (Jacek Braciak) – the Principal Designer at Febo & Dobrzański and a figure of extraordinary renown and respect in the industry. He is known as a true artist with a passion, but is also portrayed as a comic figure due to his megalomania. He has a son, Wojtek, whom he employed, but with whom he has a bad relationship due to having left his mother. He was responsible for Ula's make-over.

References

2008 telenovelas
2020 telenovelas
2008 Polish television series debuts
2020 Polish television series debuts
Yo soy Betty, la fea
Polish television soap operas
Television shows set in Warsaw
TVN (Polish TV channel) original programming